The 2008 British Superbike Championship season was scheduled to begin on 6 April 2008; however, snow at Brands Hatch forced the abandonment of the day's races, which were later rescheduled.  The series was rescheduled to start on 20 April and end on 12 October 2008.

Starting with this season the championship has a single tyre supplier.

Pirelli beat Dunlop to sign a three-year deal.

For the 2008 season the engine configuration regulations were changed in parallel with those of the World Superbike Championship, to permit the racing of 1200 cc V-twins against 1000 cc four-cylinder machines.

Calendar

Notes:
1. – The qualifying results from the original meeting were carried forward to the rescheduled meeting.
2. – The opening meeting at Brand Hatch GP was cancelled due to heavy snowfall on the Sunday; the meeting was rescheduled for 11 May.

Entry list

Support races
 Fuchs-Silkolene British Supersport Championship: Winner - Glen Richards 
 Metzeler National Superstock 1000 Championship: Winner - Steve Brogan 
 Metzeler Junior Superstock 600 Championship: Winner - Lee Johnson
 Henderson Yamaha R1 Cup: Winner - Jon Kirkham 
 British 125 GP Championship: Winner - Matthew Hoyle
 KTM 990 Super Duke Challenge: Winner - David Wood

Season standings

Riders' standings

Privateers Cup

John Laverty won the Cup class on his Buildbase NW200 Ducati.

References

External links
 BSB website

British
British Superbike Championship
Superbike